Nils Hellner (born 12 February 1965 in Göttingen) is a German archaeologist and architectural historian.

References 

Archaeologists from Lower Saxony
1965 births
Living people
Writers from Göttingen
German male non-fiction writers